Giuliano Avaca (born 25 February 2003) is an Argentine rugby union player who plays for Mogliano in Top10, on loan from Benetton. His playing position is Fly-half.

Signed in August 2022 as Academy Player for Benetton in United Rugby Championship, he made his debut for Benetton in Round 5 of the 2022–23 United Rugby Championship against .

In 2022, Avaca was named in the Argentina Under 20 squad.

References

External links
 itsrugby Profile

Living people
Argentine rugby union players
Italian rugby union players
Benetton Rugby players
Rugby union fly-halves
2003 births
Sportspeople from Córdoba, Argentina
Mogliano Rugby players